Selma Sonnet (born on 17 January 1968 in Bad Kreuznach) is a West German sport shooter. She competed in rifle shooting events at the 1988 Summer Olympics.

Olympic results

References

1968 births
Living people
ISSF rifle shooters
German female sport shooters
Shooters at the 1988 Summer Olympics
Olympic shooters of West Germany
People from Bad Kreuznach
Sportspeople from Rhineland-Palatinate